Deshamanya Prof. Jayaratna Banda Disanayake (born 16 April 1937) is an emeritus professor and one of the leading authorities of the Sinhala language. He was former Sri Lankan Ambassador to Thailand.

Academia
Dissanayake received his primary education at Dharmaraja College, Kandy and secondary education at Ananda College. He graduated from the University of Ceylon, Peradeniya campus in 1961. He later received a Fulbright scholarship to the University of California, Berkeley, to read for a Masters in linguistics and obtained a PhD from the University of Colombo.

With a long teaching career of over 45 years as a lecturer of the University of Colombo, he is the author of numerous books on linguistics, culture and history. Prior to his retirement Dissanayake served in the capacity of the Head of the Department of Sinhala at the University.

Publications

 Lanka, the land of kings  by J. B. Disanayaka (Sumitha Publishers, Distributed by Sarasavi Bookshop, 2007)
Mānava bhāṣā pravēśaya by J. B. Disanayaka(Sumita Prakāśakayō, 2005)
Paintings of Kelani Vihara by J. B. Disanayaka(Godage Poth Mendura, 2004)
Kălaṇi Vihāre situvaṃ by J. B. Disanayaka(Goḍagē Pot Măndura, 2000)
Uḍaraṭa Sinhalaya by J. B. Disanayaka(Goḍagē Pot Măndura, 2002)
Understanding the Sinhalese by J. B. Disanayaka (S. Godage & Bros., 1998)
Siyalanga rū sobā by J. B. Disanayaka (Goḍagē Pot Mandura, 1998)
Banda vaṭā pada raṭā by J. B. Disanayaka (s. Goḍagē saha Samāgama, 1996)
Gamaka suvanda siv siya gavu ăsēya by J. B. Disanayaka (s. Goḍagē saha Samāgama, 1996)
Siṃhala bhāṣāvē nava muhuṇuvara by J. B. Disanayaka (Saṃskr̥tika Kaṭayutu Depārtamēntuva, 1996)
Samakālīna Siṃhala lēkhana vyākaraṇaya by J. B. Disanayaka (s. Goḍagē saha Sahōdarayō, 1995)
The monk and the peasant by J. B. Disanayaka (State Print. Corp., 1993)
Water in culture by J. B. Disanayaka (Ministry of Environment & Parliamentary Affairs, 1992)
Siṃhala budu samaya by J. B. Disanayaka (Rajayē Mudraṇa Nītigata Saṃsthāva, 1991)
Studies in Sinhala literacy by J. B. Disanayaka(National Association for Total Education, Sri Lanka, 1990)
Nūtana Siṃhala lēkhana vyākaraṇaya by J. B. Disanayaka (Lēk Havus Invesṭmanṭs, 1990)
Siṃhala vehera vihāra by J. B. Disanayaka(Piyavi Pot Prakāśakayō, 1988)
Mihintale, cradle of Sinhala Buddhist civilization by J. B. Disanayaka(Lake House Investments, 1987)
Say it in Sinhala by J. B. Disanayaka(Lake House Investments Ltd., 1985)
Aspects of Sinhala folklore by J. B. Disanayaka(Lake House Investments, 1984)

See also
Sri Lankan Non Career Diplomats

References

External links
Sinhala New Year - a celebration of life
Suns of the Sinhalese
	New Year 2006

1937 births
Academic staff of the University of Colombo
Alumni of Dharmaraja College
Alumni of the University of Ceylon (Peradeniya)
Ambassadors of Sri Lanka to Thailand
Living people
Sri Lankan Buddhists
Sinhalese academics
Sinhalese writers